Earle Leonard Wells (27 October 1933 – 1 October 2021) was an Olympic gold medallist for New Zealand in yachting. With Helmer Pedersen, Wells won the Flying Dutchman class at the 1964 Summer Olympics in Tokyo.

Wells was born in Auckland in October 1933. He was also a rower, and his coxed four narrowly missed selection for the 1960 Summer Olympics.

He later raced in the Dragon class before taking up ocean racing and competed in 5 Sydney to Hobart Yacht Races. He helmed Condor.

Wells and Pedersen were inducted into the New Zealand Sports Hall of Fame in 1990.

Wells died on 1 October 2021, at the age of 87.

References

External links
 
 
 
 

1933 births
2021 deaths
Sportspeople from Auckland
New Zealand male sailors (sport)
Olympic gold medalists for New Zealand in sailing
Sailors at the 1964 Summer Olympics – Flying Dutchman
Medalists at the 1964 Summer Olympics
New Zealand male rowers